John Cowell (born 9 June 1887) was an English professional footballer who played as a forward for Sunderland.

References

1887 births
People from Blyth, Northumberland
Footballers from Northumberland
English footballers
Association football forwards
Castleford Town F.C. players
Rotherham Town F.C. (1899) players
Bristol City F.C. players
Sunderland A.F.C. players
Lisburn Distillery F.C. players
Belfast Celtic F.C. players
Durham City A.F.C. players
English Football League players
Year of death missing